Ragnarok and Roll is a role-playing game adventure published by TSR in 1988 for the Marvel Super Heroes role-playing game.

Contents
Ragnarok and Roll is a scenario for the Advanced rules, and a sequel to Cosmos Cubed. The mightiest Marvel heroes face off against the Elders of the Universe in Asgard and Olympus.

Publication history
ME2 Ragnarok and Roll was written by Troy Denning, and was published by TSR, Inc., in 1988 as a 48-page book and an outer folder.

Reception

Reviews

References

Marvel Comics role-playing game adventures
Role-playing game supplements introduced in 1988